Nova Gora is a small settlement in the hills west of Gabrovka in the Municipality of Litija in central Slovenia. The area is part of the traditional region of Lower Carniola. It is now included with the rest of the municipality in the Central Sava Statistical Region.

East of the village is a monument to 54 Partisans killed nearby in the Second World War. It was erected in 1959.

References

External links
Nova Gora on Geopedia

Populated places in the Municipality of Litija